Emma Espiner (née Wehipeihana) is a New Zealand broadcaster and political commentator. In 2020, she won Opinion Writer of the Year at the Voyager Media Awards.

Biography 
Espiner grew up in Wellington. Her mother, Colleen Smith, was a feminist activist and Espiner was involved in feminist protests from a young age. Her father was Martin Wehipeihana. Of Māori descent, Espiner has whakapapa (heritage) to the Ngāti Tukorehe and Ngāti Porou iwi. She graduated with a Bachelor of Medicine and Bachelor of Surgery from the University of Auckland in 2020.

She is a columnist for Newsroom and hosts a podcast Getting Better for Radio New Zealand about Māori health equity.

Personal life 
Espiner is married to journalist Guyon Espiner.

References

External links 

 
 

Year of birth missing (living people)
Living people
New Zealand journalists
New Zealand podcasters
New Zealand women podcasters
Ngāti Porou people
Ngāti Raukawa people